Emil Purgly de Jószáshely (19 February 1880 – 13 May 1964) was a Hungarian politician, who served as Minister of Agriculture in 1932.

He was a cousin of Magdolna Purgly, wife of Regent Miklós Horthy.

References
 Magyar Életrajzi Lexikon	

1880 births
1964 deaths
People from Battonya
People from the Kingdom of Hungary
Hungarian Lutherans
Agriculture ministers of Hungary
20th-century Lutherans